The Boys Are Back is the sixth studio album released by the American country music band Sawyer Brown. Released in 1989 on Capitol Records, it features three singles: "The Race Is On" (a cover of a George Jones song), "I Did It for Love", and 
"Puttin' the Dark Back into the Night".

Track listing

Personnel 
Sawyer Brown
 Mark Miller – lead vocals, prempensua
 Gregg "Hobie" Hubbard – keyboards, backing vocals
 Bobby Randall – lead guitars, backing vocals
 Jim Scholten – bass
 Joe "Curley" Smyth – drums, percussion 

Additional musicians
 John Barlow Jarvis – keyboards, acoustic piano
 Mike Lawler – synthesizers
 Steve Gibson – acoustic guitar, electric guitar
 Don Potter – acoustic guitar
 Randy Scruggs – guitars 
 Eddie Bayers – drums, percussion
 Jerry Kroon – drums, percussion
 Terry McMillan – harmonica, percussion
 Mark O'Connor – fiddle
 Mac McAnally – vocal arrangements

Production 
 Mark Miller – producer 
 Randy Scruggs – producer 
 Ron "Snake" Reynolds – recording, mixing 
 John Kliner – backing engineer 
 Milan Bogdan – digital editing 
 Glenn Meadows – mastering at Masterfonics (Nashville, Tennessee)
 Bonnie Rasmussen – art coordinator
 Bill Brunt Designs – art direction 
 Greg Gorman – photography

Charts

Weekly charts

Year-end charts

Certifications

References

External links
[ The Boys Are Back] at Allmusic

1989 albums
Capitol Records albums
Sawyer Brown albums